Huntingdon Town Football Club is a football club based in Huntingdon, Cambridgeshire, England.

History
The original Huntingdon Town was formed in the 1800s and won the Huntingdonshire Senior Cup eleven times before World War I. They joined the Peterborough & District League in 1922. Although they left the league in 1926, they returned the following year. Their second spell in the league ended in 1932, although they returned again in 1935. They remained in the league until  merging with Huntingdon Wanderers to form Huntingdon United in 1948.

The modern club was established in 1980 as Montagu Football Club. They were later renamed Sun Football Club, before adopting their current name when transferring from the West Anglian League to Division 2B of the Cambridgeshire League in 1996. They were promoted to Division 1B at the end of the 1997–98 season, and went on to win the division in 1999–2000, as well as the Hunts Junior Cup, which they retained for the next two seasons. In 2001–02 the club were runners-up in the Senior B Division.

In 2003 Huntingdon moved up to Division One of the United Counties League when they moved to Jubilee Park. They were Division One champions in 2011–12, earning promotion to the Premier Division. In 2013–14 the club were Premier Division runners-up and won the League Cup. However, they finished bottom of the Premier Division in 2015–16 but were reprieved from relegation as two clubs left the league. However, after finishing bottom again the following season, the club were relegated to Division One. At the end of the 2020–21 season they were transferred to Division One North of the Eastern Counties League.

Ground
The club moved to Jubilee Park in 2003. Floodlights were installed in July 2004 and inaugurated with a friendly match against Peterborough United. A new clubhouse was opened in 2009, and a 50-seat stand built during the 2011–12 season. Another 50-seat stand was opened during the following season.

Honours
United Counties League
Division One champions 2011–12
League Cup winners 2013–14
Cambridgeshire League 
Division 1B Champions 1999–2000
Hinchingbrooke Cup
Winners 2013–14
Hunts Junior Cup
Winners 1999–2000, 2000–01, 2001–02
Hunts Scott Gatty Cup
Winners 2001–02

Records
Best FA Cup performance: First qualifying round, 2011–12, 2012–13, 2013–14
Best FA Vase performance: Third round, 2013–14

See also
Huntingdon Town F.C. players

References

External links
Official website

Football clubs in England
Football clubs in Cambridgeshire
Association football clubs disestablished in 1948
1948 disestablishments in England
Association football clubs established in 1980
1980 establishments in England
Huntingdon
Peterborough and District Football League
Cambridgeshire County Football League
United Counties League
Eastern Counties Football League